Michitaka (written: , ,  or ) is a masculine Japanese given name. Notable people with the name include:

, Japanese footballer
, Japanese kugyō
, Japanese hurdler
, Japanese voice actor
, Japanese kuge
, Japanese baseball player

Japanese masculine given names